Caenoscelis is a genus of silken fungus beetles in the family Cryptophagidae. There are about 19 described species in Caenoscelis.

Species
These 19 species belong to the genus Caenoscelis:

 Caenoscelis angelinii Johnson & Bowestead, 2003
 Caenoscelis angusticollis Casey, 1900
 Caenoscelis antennalis (Casey, 1924)
 Caenoscelis basalis Casey, 1900
 Caenoscelis cryptophaga Reitter, 1875
 Caenoscelis elongata Casey, 1900
 Caenoscelis ferruginea (Sahlberg, 1820)
 Caenoscelis humifera Esser, 2008
 Caenoscelis macilenta Casey, 1900
 Caenoscelis macra Casey, 1900
 Caenoscelis obscura Casey, 1900
 Caenoscelis ochreosa Casey, 1900
 Caenoscelis ovipennis Casey, 1900
 Caenoscelis paralella Casey, 1900
 Caenoscelis shastanica Casey, 1900
 Caenoscelis sibirica Reitter, 1889
 Caenoscelis subdeplanata Brisout de Barneville, 1882
 Caenoscelis subfuscata Casey, 1900
 Caenoscelis tenerifensis Johnson & Bowestead, 2003

References

Further reading

External links

 

Cryptophagidae
Articles created by Qbugbot